Fred McCardle (born 4 February 1951) is a Canadian politician, who represented the electoral district of Borden-Kinkora in the Legislative Assembly of Prince Edward Island from 2003 to 2007. He was a member of the Prince Edward Island Progressive Conservative Party. McCardle is a fifth generation farmer who has run his family farm for 35 years; growing potatoes, cereals and grasses.

He subsequently stood as a candidate in the party's 2010 leadership race, but lost to Olive Crane.

References

Living people
People from Prince County, Prince Edward Island
Progressive Conservative Party of Prince Edward Island MLAs
21st-century Canadian politicians
1951 births